Lộc Thủy is a commune in Lệ Thủy District, Quảng Bình Province, Vietnam. Local economy is mainly agricultural, rice production and cattle breeding. Lộc Thủy is famous in this district for its Lộc Thủy liquor. The commune is the birthplace of Vietnamese general Võ Nguyên Giáp.

It borders following communes: An Thủy to the north, Phong Thủy to the south, Hồng Thủy to the east, and An Thủy to the west.

References

Communes of Quảng Bình province
Võ Nguyên Giáp